The 2022 Arizona gubernatorial election occurred on November 8, 2022, to elect the next governor of Arizona concurrently with other federal and state elections. Incumbent Republican governor Doug Ducey was term-limited and ineligible to run for a third consecutive term. Democratic Arizona Secretary of State Katie Hobbs won the election against Republican former television anchor Kari Lake.

Primaries were held on August 2 for both parties, with Lake winning the Republican nomination and Hobbs winning the Democratic nomination, making this the first gubernatorial election in Arizona history in which both major party candidates for governor were women. Hobbs became the fifth female governor of Arizona, with Arizona setting a record for the most female governors in American history. With the concurrent passage of Proposition 131, this was the last gubernatorial election in Arizona without a lieutenant governor on the ticket.

Going into the election, most polling had Lake leading and analysts generally considered the race to either be a tossup or leaning towards the Republican. Nonetheless, Hobbs ultimately defeated Lake with 50.32% of the vote, becoming the first Democrat elected governor of Arizona since Janet Napolitano in 2006. Lake refused to concede and filed a post-election lawsuit in an attempt to overturn the results, with all her claims either being dismissed or ruled against for lack of evidence.

This race was one of six Republican-held governorships up for election in 2022 taking place in a state that was carried by Democrat Joe Biden in the 2020 presidential election. With a margin of 0.67%, it was the closest election of the 2022 gubernatorial election cycle.

Republican primary

Candidates

Nominee 
Kari Lake, former KSAZ-TV news anchor

Eliminated in primary
Scott Neely, businessman
Karrin Taylor Robson, land developer and member of the Arizona Board of Regents
Paola Tulliani-Zen, businesswoman

Withdrew
Steve Gaynor, businessman and nominee for Arizona Secretary of State in 2018
Kimberly Yee, Arizona State Treasurer (running for re-election)

Declined
Kirk Adams, former Chief of Staff to Governor Doug Ducey and former Speaker of the Arizona House of Representatives
Mark Brnovich, Arizona Attorney General (ran for the U.S. Senate)
Steve Chucri, Maricopa County supervisor

Kelli Ward, chair of the Arizona Republican Party, former state senator and candidate for the U.S. Senate in 2016 and 2018

Endorsements

Polling 
Aggregate polls

Graphical summary

Karrin Taylor Robson vs. Matt Salmon

Results

Democratic primary

Candidates

Nominee 

 Katie Hobbs, Arizona Secretary of State

Eliminated in primary 
Marco López Jr., former Chief of Staff for the U.S. Customs and Border Protection and former Mayor of Nogales

Withdrawn 
Aaron Lieberman, former state representative for the 28th district

Declined 
Charlene Fernandez, Minority Leader of the Arizona House of Representatives
Kate Gallego, Mayor of Phoenix

Endorsements

Polling 
Graphical summary

Results

Libertarian primary

Candidates

Eliminated in primary 
 Barry Hess, perennial candidate

Results
Write-in candidate Barry Hess was unopposed in the Libertarian primary, but failed to secure the minimum number of votes to receive the nomination.

Certified write-in candidates

Anthony Camboni (independent)                                                               
Steph Denny (Republican)
Mikki Lutes-Burton (Libertarian)
Shawn Merrill (independent)
Alice Novoa (Republican)
William Pounds IV (Independent-Green)
Liana West (Green)

General election
Lake was criticized for her denial of Joe Biden's victory in the 2020 presidential election. She had made her closeness to former president Donald Trump central to her campaign. Hobbs refused to debate Lake, which became a highly discussed issue of the campaign, earning criticism from Republicans. On October 16, 2022, Lake twice refused to say that she will accept the result if she does not win the election: "I'm going to win the election, and I will accept that result."

According to Politico, the race was considered a toss-up. Lake called both the primaries and current round of elections "incompetent" and stated that "honest elections are needed" and that "the system we have right now does not work".

Debates and forums 

Katie Hobbs refused to debate Kari Lake, though one debate-like forum was held.

Predictions

Endorsements

{{Endorsements box
| title= Katie Hobbs (D)
| list=
U.S. Executive Branch officials
Barack Obama, 44th President of the United States (2009–2017)

U.S. Senators

U.S. Representatives

Local officials
 Sam Campana, former Mayor of Scottsdale (Republican)
 John Giles, Mayor of Mesa (2014–present) (Republican)

State legislators 
Lela Alston, former state senator from 24th district (2019–present)
Richard Andrade, state representative for 29th district (2015–present)
Sean Bowie, state senator from 18th district (2017–present)
Lupe Contreras, state senator from 19th district (2015–present)
Andrea Dalessandro, state representative for 2nd district (2021–present)
Kirsten Engel, former state senator from 10th district (2021)
Stephanie Stahl Hamilton, state representative for 10th district (2021–present)
Pamela Hannley, state representative for 9th district (2017–present)
Steve May, former state representative for 26th district (1997–2000) (Republican)Jamescita Peshlakai, former state senator from 7th district (2017–2021)
Martín Quezada, state senator from 29th district (2015–present)
Victoria Steele, state senator from 9th district (2019–present)
Individuals 
Camila Cabello, singer
Kerry Washington, actress
Labor Unions
AFL–CIO
Communications Workers of America
National Education Association
United Mine Workers of America
Organizations
EMILY's List
 Equality Arizona
Chicanos Por La Causa
National Women's Political Caucus
Human Rights Campaign
Planned Parenthood
MoveOn
Everytown for Gun Safety
End Citizens United
Let America Vote
Stonewall Democrats
NARAL Pro-Choice America
Emerge America
Feminist Majority PAC
Fund Her PAC
Democrats Serve PAC
}}

Polling
Aggregate polls

Graphical summary

Karrin Taylor Robson vs. Katie Hobbs

Matt Salmon vs. Katie Hobbs

Steve Gaynor vs. Katie Hobbs

Generic Republican vs. generic Democrat

 Results 

 Dispute over results 

On November 17, Lake refused to concede defeat, and announced she was assembling a legal team to challenge the results. Lake alleged voter disfranchisement due to ballot printing problems and long waiting lines in Maricopa County, which had elections run by local Republican officials Bill Gates and Stephen Richer. In 70 out of 223 Maricopa County polling sites, voting machine ballots were printed too lightly to be read by tabulators; the problem was caused by a printer setting which had not shown widespread issues during prior testing. If voters did not want to wait in line for the issue to be fixed, they could leave to vote at another Maricopa County polling site, with wait times for polling sites being shown online, and many polling sites had little to no waiting lines, stated Maricopa County election officials. Alternatively, voters could drop their ballots into a secure box ("Box 3"), with these ballots being later tabulated at Maricopa County's elections headquarters, under monitoring from observers from both parties; ultimately, around 17,000 Maricopa County ballots were dropped into Box 3.

Bill Gates, the Republican chair of Maricopa's Board of Supervisors, partially blamed the long lines on Arizona Republican Party chairwoman Kelli Ward for discouraging voters from using Box 3; she had claimed that Box 3 should not be used as "Maricopa County is not turning on their tabulators downtown today". Lake herself told her supporters to stay in line to vote, while a lawyer for Lake's campaign assuaged concerns about using Box 3 to vote. Lake's campaign filed a lawsuit on Election Day to extend voting for another three hours, but Maricopa County Superior Court Judge Tim Ryan declined to do so, stating: "The court doesn't have any evidence that any voter was precluded from their right to vote".

While Lake alleged that Republican-dominated areas in Maricopa County were disproportionately affected by the printing problems, The Washington Post found that the percentage of registered Republicans in affected precincts (37%) was very close to the percentage of registered Republicans across Maricopa County (35%), and also found that some Democrat-dominated areas also faced the printing problems. According to the Associated Press: "Democrats voted overwhelmingly via ballots received in the mail. In-person Election Day votes heavily favored the GOP because Lake and other prominent Republicans had claimed it was more secure, which election experts dispute." Meanwhile, The New York Times'' analyzed 45 of the claims of irregularities reported by voters, finding that in 34 of these 45 claims, the voters were able to cast their vote despite an inconvenience; while for the others, three raised problems with voter registration; seven gave unclear accounts as to what exactly happened; and only one said she had been denied the opportunity to vote, though she acknowledged she had arrived at her polling place at the time it closed.

Arizona's Assistant Attorney General Jennifer Wright demanded that Maricopa County explain the election problems, stating: "These complaints go beyond pure speculation, but include first-hand witness accounts that raise concerns regarding Maricopa's lawful compliance with Arizona election law".

Delays in certification of voting results 
14 of Arizona's 15 counties certified the voting results by the November 28, 2022 deadline; the exception was Cochise County. Despite no evidence of irregularities with vote counting, Cochise County's Republican officials delayed their certification vote to December 2, 2022, to accommodate a hearing on the certification of voting machines.  Previously on November 21, Arizona's State Elections Director, Kori Lorick, had sent County officials confirmation that the county's voting machines had been certified by the United States Election Assistance Commission in an accredited laboratory. However, the county's officials insisted on hearing more from those who had without evidence alleged that the voting machines were not properly certified.

On November 29, Hobbs, as Secretary of State, sued the county for being unable to certify results by the deadline.

On December 1, the Pima County Superior Court ruled that the Cochise County Board of Supervisors must hold an emergency meeting on the same day to certify and approve the canvass. Hours later, the Board voted 2–0 to do so.

Lawsuit 
On December 9, 2022, after Arizona certified the election, Lake initiated a lawsuit seeking a court order to either overturn Hobbs' victory and declare Lake as the winner of the election, or redo the election in Maricopa County. Lake's complaint alleged that there were hundreds of thousands of illegal votes in the election, but no evidence was provided. On December 19, Maricopa County Superior Court Judge Peter Thompson dismissed eight of ten counts of Lake's lawsuit, regarding invalid signatures on mail-in ballots, incorrect certification, inadequate remedy, as well as violations of freedom of speech, equal protection, due process, the secrecy clause, and constitutional rights. The judge allowed the remaining two counts to go to trial, these being allegations that election officials intentionally interfered with Maricopa County ballot printers and with the chain of custody of Maricopa County ballots. The judge ruled that Lake needed to prove during the trial that the above allegations were true, and that the alleged actions "did in fact result in a changed outcome" of the election.

Lake's reaction to the judge's initial ruling was declaring: "Arizona, We will have our day in court!" During the two-day trial, Northrop Grumman information security officer Clay Parikh, a witness called by Lake, testified that some ballots had printing errors that would cause tabulation issues, but also testified that these misprinted ballots would ultimately be counted after duplicates were made. On December 24, judge Thompson dismissed Lake's remaining case, as the court did not find clear and convincing evidence that misconduct was committed. The judge wrote: "Every single witness before the Court disclaimed any personal knowledge of such [intentional] misconduct. The Court cannot accept speculation or conjecture in place of clear and convincing evidence". The judge further ruled that "printer failures did not actually affect the results of the election", while highlighting that one witness called by Lake testified that "printer failures were largely the result of unforeseen mechanical failure." Regarding the witness Richard Baris, a pollster, who alleged that potential voters were disenfranchised, the judge noted Baris' testimony that "nobody can give a specific number" of people who were disenfranchised, and called Baris' analysis "decidedly insufficient" in this case, because Baris' analysis showed that Hobbs "had a good chance of winning anyway" even after reversing the supposed disenfranchisement.

On December 30, 2022, Lake appealed the ruling to the First Division of the Arizona Court of Appeals. Lake also attempted to transfer her appeal directly to the Arizona Supreme Court, which denied this on January 4, 2023, ruling that there was "no good cause" to do so. On February 16, a three-judge panel for the Arizona Court of Appeals affirmed Thompson's ruling; chief judge Kent Cattani wrote the opinion and two other judges, Maria Elena Cruz and Peter Swann, concurred. The appeals court found that "Lake’s only purported evidence" that long lines at voting centres "had any potential effect on election results was, quite simply, sheer speculation." The appeals court noted that "Lake presented no evidence that voters whose ballots were unreadable by on-site tabulators were not able to vote", while highlighting that Lake's own cybersecurity expert testified to the contrary. While Lake alleged that there was improper chain-of-custody documentation in Maricopa County, the appeals court decided that the lower court reasonably concluded that Lake failed to prove this allegation. While Lake alleged that Maricopa County had improperly handled early ballots from election day, the appeals court ruled that even if this allegation was true, Lake "failed to present evidence, as opposed to speculation", that this affected the result of the election. In summary, the appeals court wrote that the evidence presented in court showed that "voters were able to cast their ballots, that votes were counted correctly and that no other basis justifies setting aside the election results".

Lake filed an appeal to the Arizona Supreme Court on March 1, 2023.

See also 
 2022 Arizona elections

Notes

Partisan clients

References

External links 
Official campaign websites
 Katie Hobbs (D) for Governor
 Kari Lake (R) for Governor
 Mikaela Lutes-Burton (L) for Governor
 William Pounds IV (IG) for Governor
 Liana West (G) for Governor

2022
Arizona
Governor